The JAF Grand Prix All Japan Fuji 1000 km, was the second round of both the 1989 All Japan Sports Prototype Championship and the 1989 Fuji Long Distance Series was held at the Fuji International Speedway, on the 30 April, in front of a crowd of approximately 58,000.

Report

Entry
A total of 17 cars were entered for the event, in two classes, one for cars running to Group C1 specification and the other to IMSA GTP regulations.

Qualifying
The Nissan Motorsport car of Anders Olofsson and Masahiro Hasemi took pole position, in their Nissan R88C ahead of team mates Kazuyoshi Hoshino and Toshio Suzuki, by only 0.269secs.

Race
The race was held over 224 laps of the Fuji circuit, a distance of 1000 km (actual distance was 1001.28 km). Vern Schuppan, Eje Elgh and Keiji Matsumoto took the winner spoils for the Omron Racing Team, driving their Porsche 962C. The trio won in a time of 5hr 30:36.816mins., averaging a speed of 133.571 mph. Second place went to George Fouché and Steven Andskär in the Trust Racing Team’s Porsche 962GTi who finished about 15 seconds adrift. Coming in third was the pole winning Nissan of Olofsson and Hasemi. They finished 1 lap behind the winners.

Classification

Result
Class Winners are in Bold text.

 Fastest lap: Geoff Lees/Hitoshi Ogawa, 1:21:418secs. (112.98 mph)

References

All Japan Sports Prototype Championship
Fuji Long Distance Series
All Japan Fuji 1000km
6 Hours of Fuji
Fuji